Chakeri or Chakari may refer to:
 Chakeri, Hormozgan (چكري - Chakerī)
 Chakeri, Kerman (چكري - Chakerī)
 Chakeri, Yazd (چاكري - Chākerī)